The 864th Aircraft Control and Warning Squadron is an inactive United States Air Force unit. It was last assigned to the Phoenix Air Defense Sector, Air Defense Command, stationed at Yuma Air Force Station, Arizona. It was inactivated on 1 August 1963.

The unit was a General Surveillance Radar squadron providing for the air defense of the United States.

Lineage
 Constituted as the 864th Aircraft Control and Warning Squadron
 Activated on 8 August 1955
 Redesignated 864th Radar Squadron (SAGE), 1 June 1962
 Redesignation retroactively revoked
 Discontinued and inactivated on 1 August 1963

Assignments
 27th Air Division, 8 August 1955
 Los Angeles Air Defense Sector, 1 October 1959
 Phoenix Air Defense Sector, 1 May 1961 – 1 August 1963

Stations
 Yuma County Airport, Arizona, 8 August 1955
 Base redesignated Vincent AFB, 1 September 1956
 Station redesignated Yuma AFS, 20 July 1962 - 1 August 1963

References

 Cornett, Lloyd H. and Johnson, Mildred W., A Handbook of Aerospace Defense Organization  1946 - 1980,  Office of History, Aerospace Defense Center, Peterson AFB, CO (1980).
 Winkler, David F. & Webster, Julie L., Searching the Skies, The Legacy of the United States Cold War Defense Radar Program,  US Army Construction Engineering Research Laboratories, Champaign, IL (1997).

External links

Radar squadrons of the United States Air Force
Aerospace Defense Command units